Dr. Vicki L. Gregory is  professor at the School of Information at the University of South Florida (USF). She and was director of the School from 1999 until 2007. Her fields of specialization include: academic libraries, digital librarianship, technical services, information science, library networking, library automation, and collection development. She currently teaches Introduction to Library Administration, Collection Development/Maintenance, and Digital Libraries. Prior to teaching at USF Dr. Gregory was Director of Systems and Operations for the Auburn University at Montgomery Library. She is currently President of Beta Phi Mu.  She was Treasurer for the Association for Information Science and Technology  (ASIS&T) and the winner of the 2014 Watson Davis Award. She is also the author, co-author, or editor of seven books and has published numerous articles.

Education
Gregory received  an A.B. in History in 1971 from the University of Alabama (UA), and a M.A. in History, also at UA, in 1973. Remaining at the University of Alabama, she went on to complete the Graduate School of Library Service's M.L.S. degree in 1974. Finally, she received her Ph.D. in Communication, Information and Library Studies from Rutgers, The State University of New Jersey, in 1987.

Career
Gregory began her professional career at the Auburn University at Montgomery Library in 1976 as an audio-visual librarian and a supervisor for the Acquisitions Department, then Coordinator of Technical Services, and finally Head of the Department of Systems and Operations. She finished her time at the library in 1988, by which time she had become a tenured librarian.

In August 1988 she became an assistant professor at the School of Library and Information Science at the University of South Florida (USF). She was tenured and promoted to associate professor in 1994, then professor in 2000. That same year she was made director of the School of Library and Information Science, a position she held until 2007. She is currently a professor at the USF School of Information.

Professional activities
Vicki Gregory has been active in many professional associations. She is president of Beta Phi Mu, the international honor society.  and is past Treasurer for the Association for Information Science & Technology (ASIS&T). She has served the American Library Association (ALA) as a Member-at-Large for the Library Research Roundtable Steering Committee, and she was the ALA Councilor for the Florida Library Association (FLA). Dr. Gregory has served as Chair of the ALA Committee on Accreditation from 2010 until 2012 and was a member of the Committee from 2007 until 2009. She is currently serving on the ALA Notable Book Council. Gregory was director of the FLA from 2001 until 2003, was a past chair of the Florida ASIS&T, past Chair of ASIS&T's Special Interest Group - Library Technologies (SIG-LT), a past chair of the Association of College and Research Libraries (ACRL) Academic/Research Librarian of the Year Committee, past chair of the ACRL Research Committee, and a past Secretary of the Library Research Round Table Steering Committee. She serves as Florida representative to the Southeastern Library Association.

Honors
 Beta Phi Mu (Library and Information Science Honorary Society)
 1985 Recipient of the Association of College and Research Libraries and Institute for Scientific Information Doctoral Dissertation Fellowship
 1987 Selected as one of the Outstanding Young Women of America
 1995 Florida SUS Teaching Incentive Program Award
 1996 Florida Library Association Transformers Honor Roll
 2003 USF President's Award for Faculty Excellence
 Phi Alpha Theta (History Honorary Society)
 2007 Outstanding Alumni, University of Alabama, Graduate School of Library and Information Science
 2014 Watson Davis Award, American Society for Information Science & Technology (ASIS&T)

Select journal articles
 Gregory, V., & Cox, K. (2013). Implications of voluntary communication based on gender, education level and cultural issues in an online environment. Informing Science & Information Technology, 10, 227-239.
 Kwon, N., & Gregory, V. (2007). The effects of librarians' behavioral performance on user satisfaction in chat reference services. Reference & User Services Quarterly, 47(2), 137-148
 Hastings, S., Gregory, V., Montague, R., & Lester, J. (2005). Distance education: How are we doing, and how do we know? Proceedings of the American Society for Information Science and Technology, 42(1), NA-NA.
 Gregory, V., & Wohlmuth, S. R. (2002). Planning for the internationalization of a postgraduate professional degree programme in library and information science. Higher Education in Europe, 27(3), 261-268.
 Perrault, A., & Gregory, V. (2002). The integration of assessment of student learning outcomes and teaching effectiveness.

Books
Gregory V. (2019) Collection development and management for 21st century library collections. (2nd ed.) Chicago: ALA Editions.
 Gregory, V., de la Peña McCook, K., & Long, A. (Eds.). (2011). ACURIL XLI: Proceedings from the annual conference: The role of libraries and archives in disaster preparedness. Tampa, FL: Association of Caribbean University, Research and Institutional Libraries.
 Gregory, V. (2011). Collection development and management for the Twenty-First Century library collections. New York, NY: Neal-Schuman, Inc.
 Gregory, V. (2006). Selecting and Managing Electronic Resources. New York, NY: Neal-Schuman, Inc.
 Gregory, V. (Ed.). (2000). Selecting and managing electronic resources. New York, NY: Neal-Schuman, Inc.
 Gregory, V., & Stauffer, M. (1999). Multicultural resources on the Internet: The United States and Canada. Littleton, CO: Libraries Unlimited
 Gregory, V. (1993). The state and the academic library. Westport, CN: Greenwood Press
 Gregory, V. (Ed.). (1991). A dynamic tradition: A history of Alabama academic libraries. Birmingham, AL: Birmingham Public Library Press.

References

American librarians
American women librarians
Year of birth missing (living people)
Living people
University of Alabama alumni
Rutgers University alumni
Auburn University at Montgomery faculty
University of South Florida faculty
American women academics
21st-century American women